Laidley Burge (1896–1990) was a rugby league footballer in New South Wales during the 1910s and 1920s.

Playing career
Burge played seven seasons and 64 first grade games for the Glebe Dirty Reds between 1916 and 1922, many of them alongside his brother Frank Burge.

He and Frank formed a front-row partnership in the Glebe side that contested the 1922 NSWRL Grand final against North Sydney which Glebe lost 35-3 at the Sydney Cricket Ground. He retired from rugby league after that game.

Death
Burge died on 17 September 1990, age 93 at his home at Gold Coast, Queensland and was the last of the famous Burge brothers to die.

See also
Burge Family

References

Sources
 Andrews, Malcolm (2006) The ABC of Rugby League, Austn Broadcasting Corpn, Sydney
 Whiticker, Alan (2004) Captaining the Kangaroos, New Holland, Sydney
 Whiticker, Alan & Hudson, Glen (2006) The Encyclopedia of Rugby League Players, Gavin Allen Publishing, Sydney
 Whiticker, Alan & Collis, Ian (2006) The History of Rugby League Clubs, New Holland, Sydney
 Heads, Ian & Middleton, David (2008) A Centenary of Rugby League, MacMillan, Sydney.
 Howell, Max (2005) Born to Lead: Wallaby Test Captains, Celebrity Books, Auckland, NZ.

Australian rugby union players
Australian rugby league players
Rugby league second-rows
Rugby league props
Glebe rugby league players
Laidley
1896 births
1990 deaths